Jaanus Teppan (born 24 June 1962) is an Estonian cross-country skier. He competed at the 1992 Winter Olympics and the 1994 Winter Olympics.

Teppan graduated from the University of Tartu in 1991 with a degree in physical education. From 2006 until 2009, he was the head coach of the Turkish cross-country skiing team, and from 2016 until 2018, he was the head coach of Estonian cross-country skiing team.

References

External links
 

1962 births
Living people
Estonian male cross-country skiers
Olympic cross-country skiers of Estonia
Cross-country skiers at the 1992 Winter Olympics
Cross-country skiers at the 1994 Winter Olympics
Sportspeople from Tartu
University of Tartu alumni
20th-century Estonian people